The Foundation for People with Learning Disabilities is part of the Mental Health Foundation, a UK charity founded in 1949, and operates as a directorate within the charity.

The Mental Health Foundation originally funded research in both learning disabilities and mental health. In 1999, it created the separate Foundation for People with Learning Disabilities. The aim of the Foundation is to promote the rights, quality of life and opportunities of people with learning disabilities and their families.

References

External links
Official website

Learning disabilities
Charities for disabled people based in the United Kingdom
Mental health organisations in the United Kingdom